Ya haw  or Yee-haw may refer to:

"Yee Haw", a song by Jake Owen
"Yee Haw", a song by The BossHoss
Yeehaw Junction, Florida

See also
 Rebel yell
 Yahoo (disambiguation)